Georg Blomstedt (1872–1933) was a Swedish stage and film actor.

Selected filmography
 The Lass from the Stormy Croft (1917)
 Thomas Graal's Ward (1922)
 Boman at the Exhibition (1923)
 The People of Simlang Valley (1924)
 A Maid Among Maids (1924)
 Ingmar's Inheritance (1925)
 Kalle Utter (1925)
 The Österman Brothers' Virago (1925)
 The Million Dollars (1926)
 The Rivals (1926)
 The Girl in Tails (1926)
 Parisiennes (1928)
 Artificial Svensson (1929)
 Ulla, My Ulla (1930)
 The People of Norrland (1930)
 Longing for the Sea (1931)
 Ship Ahoy! (1931)
 His Life's Match (1932)
 Jolly Musicians (1932)
 International Match (1932)

References

Bibliography 
 Cowie, Peter. Swedish Cinema. Zwemmer, 1966.

External links 
 

1872 births
1933 deaths
Swedish male stage actors
Swedish male film actors
Swedish male silent film actors
20th-century Swedish male actors
People from Valdemarsvik Municipality